Charles Manley Smith (August 3, 1868 – August 12, 1937) was an American politician from Vermont. He served as the 59th lieutenant governor of Vermont from 1933 to 1935 and 63rd governor of Vermont from 1935 to 1937.

Life and career
Smith was born in West Rutland, Vermont, on August 3, 1868. He graduated from Dartmouth College in 1891 and served as private secretary to former Vermont Governor Redfield Proctor when Proctor was Secretary of War.

Active in banking and insurance, Smith became President of Marble Savings Bank in 1920.

A Republican, Smith served in the Vermont State Senate from 1927 to 1929.  He was a member of the Vermont House of Representatives from 1931 to 1933, and was Ways and Means Committee Chairman. He served as Lieutenant Governor from 1933 to 1935.

Smith was elected Governor in 1934 and served from 1935 to 1937.  During his administration, the state legislature approved old age pension and unemployment compensation laws.

In December, 1936 Smith and other Marble Bank officials were charged with fraud for failing to inform account holders and authorities about an embezzlement.  In May, 1932 Smith had learned that his bank's bookkeeper had stolen $251,000.  Smith let him leave quietly, kept the theft secret, and charged the loss against the bank's surplus.

In July, 1935 the bookkeeper was named Rutland's Assistant City Treasurer and planned a candidacy for Treasurer.  To prevent this, his opponents leaked word of the theft to the press.  The bookkeeper was convicted and jailed, and the bank Treasurer received a suspended sentence and a $400 fine.  Charges against most other parties were dismissed, and Smith was acquitted at his trial.

Personal life
Smith married Mary Aurelia Stark and they had three children.

In 1936, Smith was injured in a car accident and his health began to decline. He became ill in June 1937 and died on August 12, just eight months after leaving office.  He is interred at Evergreen Cemetery, Rutland, Vermont.

References

External links
The Political Graveyard

National Governors Association.

1868 births
1937 deaths
Smith, Charles M.
Smith, Charles M.
Republican Party Vermont state senators
Republican Party members of the Vermont House of Representatives
Dartmouth College alumni
People from Rutland County, Vermont
American bank presidents
Burials at Evergreen Cemetery (Rutland, Vermont)
Republican Party governors of Vermont
People from West Rutland, Vermont